When Women Worship is a gospel album by Mary Alessi which was recorded on  at the Covenant Church in Dallas, Texas and released on .

Track listing
"There Is A River" (David Sapp, Max Sapp) - 02:02
"Thirst For You" (John Ragsdale, Jr) - 03:47
"As The Deer" (Martin Nystrom) - 02:01
"More" (Mary Alessi, Martha Munizzi) - 02:52
"The King Is Enthralled With Your Beauty" Featuring Amie Dockery - 04:07
"Always Welcome" (Alessi, Cindy Cruse-Ratliff) - 04:30
"Come Boldly" (David Binion, Mark Lowry) - 03:22
"The Prayer" - 02:47
"When I Find Him" (Jessi Rogers Goodman, Jason Rogers) - 03:53
"I Open My Heart" (Binion, Tanya Godman Sykes, Michael Sykes) - 03:20
"I Surrender All (All To Him I Owe)" (Alessi, Aaron W. Lindsey) - 04:17
"I Surrender All (Yo Me Rindo A El)" (Judson Wheeler Van De Venter, Winfield S. Weeden) - 02:04
"Decorating Nations (Conceiving The Impossible)" - 11:16
"Overshadow Me" (Binion, Alessi, Amie Dockery, Lindsey) - 04:51
"Overshadowed Overtre (The Enter-lude)" (Lindsey) - 01:13
"Great Grace" (Lindsey, Alessi) - 05:09
"Great Grace (Reprise)" - 06:19
"You Are God" (Kurt Carr) - 02:05
"Agnus Dei" (Michael W. Smith) - 05:00

Personnel
Mary Alessi - Vocals
Nicole Binion - Vocals
Ingrid Rosario - Vocals
Amie Dockery - Vocals
Da'Dra Crawford Greathouse - Vocals
Cindy Cruse Ratcliff - Vocals
Martha Munizzi - Vocals
Aaron W. Lindsey - Piano and Keys
Clay Bogan III - Aux Keys and Synths
Charles "Chuck" Bethany - Organ
Braylin Lacey - Bass
Aaron DeLos Santos - Acoustic & Electric Guitars
Chris Coleman - Drums
Tuwana Kemp - Background Vocals
Nicole Miller-Crenshaw - Studio Background Vocals
Anitha Abraham - Background Vocals
Andria Sirka - Background Vocals
Joyce Halbert - Studio Background Vocals
Christina (George) Williams - Background Vocals
Lacy Edley - Background Vocals
Keisha Bethany - Background Vocals
The Women of the Covenant Church Choir-Background Vocals

Certification and Chart Success
When Women Worship peaked at #13 on Billboard magazine's Top Gospel Albums, #37 on the Top Christian Albums chart, and  #34 on the Top Heatseekers album charts.

References

Mary Alessi albums
2007 live albums